Spectrum Signal Processing by Vecima is a technology company and commercial off-the-shelf (COTS) product provider, based in Vancouver, British Columbia.  Spectrum designs and builds board and system-level hardware and software solutions for signal processing applications. Since May 2, 2007, Spectrum has operated as a division of Vecima Networks Inc., a Canadian technology company.  In addition, Spectrum Signal Processing (USA), Inc. is a subsidiary of Vecima Networks Inc., and is primarily a sales organization for Spectrum's products in the United States.

History

1987
Spectrum Signal Processing is founded.

2007
Spectrum Signal Processing is acquired by Vecima Networks Inc., becoming Spectrum Signal Processing by Vecima.

Products and Services 
Spectrum designs and builds I/O modules (RF, analog and digital I/O) and integrated software-reconfigurable platforms for customer applications such as software-defined radio (SDR), Intelligence, Surveillance and Reconnaissance (ISR); military communications (MILCOM), satellite communications (SATCOM), Datalinks, and radar. Spectrum's products are designed and manufactured in Burnaby, British Columbia, Canada.

Hardware
Spectrum provides RF, signal processing engines, analog and digital I/O modules, along with integrated systems and subsystems, in CompactPCI (cPCI), PCI Express (PCIe), VME, XMC/PMC, AMC and VPX form factors.

See also 
 Signal Processing
 Canadian companies

References

External links
 Spectrum Signal Processing
 Vecima Networks

Companies based in Burnaby
Technology companies of Canada